Lepidium oblongum is a widespread North American  species of flowering plant in the mustard family known by the common name veiny pepperweed. It is native to Mexico, Guatemala, El Salvador, and the western and south-central United States (from California and Oregon east as far as Mississippi). It is present as an introduced species in Hawaii. It can grow in many types of habitats.

Description
Lepidium oblongum is an annual herb with a small, branching stem up to 20 or 30 centimeters (8-12 inches) long and coated with hairs. The well-spaced leaves are divided into narrow lobes. The inflorescence is a raceme of tiny flowers made up just of sepals; there is occasionally a vestigial petal mixed in. The flowers yield fruits which are notched capsules 2 or 3 millimeters long. Flowers bloom March to August. There are two varieties of this plant; one, var. insulare, is known only from coastal California and Baja California. It grows in pastures, prairies, floodplains, roadsides, and alluvial terraces.

References

External links
Jepson Manual Treatment
Calphotos Photo gallery, University of California
photo of herbarium specimen at Missouri Botanical Garden, collected in Puebla in 1097

oblongum
Flora of Central America
Flora of Mexico
Flora of the United States
Flora of the South-Central United States
Flora of the Great Plains (North America)
Flora of California
Natural history of the California chaparral and woodlands
Plants described in 1903
Flora without expected TNC conservation status